Dark Seed II is a psychological horror point-and-click adventure game developed and published by Cyberdreams in 1995, and is the sequel to the 1992 game Dark Seed. It sees recurring protagonist Mike Dawson's continued adventures in the H. R. Giger artwork-based "Dark World". Designed and written by Raymond Benson, the game was released for Microsoft Windows 3.x, Macintosh, Sega Saturn, and Sony PlayStation. As was the case with Dark Seed, console versions of Dark Seed II were released only in Japan, though they were additionally fully dubbed in Japanese. Unlike the original game, the Saturn version of Dark Seed II does not support the shuttle mouse.

Storyline
Although Mike Dawson saved the world from the "Ancients" in Dark Seed, the experience causes him to undergo a mental breakdown. He returns to his childhood hometown of Crowley, Texas in an attempt to regain his sanity, and moves in with his mother. A year goes by, and Mike is still suffering from serious mental scarring and memory lapses. Worse, Rita, his girlfriend, is found murdered after their high school reunion, and the entire town of Crowley seems convinced that Mike is the culprit, with the exception of his friend Jack. It is evident the "Ancients" have returned, and the only way for Mike to clear his name is by venturing between alternate realities and solving their mysteries, while simultaneously stopping the Ancients from taking over the world.

If Mike dies at any point in the game, he is sent to the Underworld and meets the Keeper of the Souls, who states that Mike is destined to die. If Mike loses another life, he will return to the Underworld and plunge into a River of Blood, while the Keeper of the Scrolls informs the player that the Ancients have consequently created a monster called the "Behemoth", and that it has sucked the "life force" from earth. This will also happen near the game's finale if Mike fails to clear the Dark World mirror maze ahead of the Behemoth, allowing it to cross over into the "Light World" where it becomes immortal.

Mike enters the Dark World counterpart of his home, identical to it in the Light World, and after a seemingly normal greeting from his "mother", her head violently explodes. Mike then sees Rita's head shrouded in the vapors of his mom's cooking, who explains about the Behemoth and that the "Sword" is powerful enough to kill it. Mike obtains the Sword from the Keeper of the Sword, and the Keeper of the Scrolls advises him to take a shortcut through the Dark World mirror maze. If he succeeds, he will successfully kill the monster with his Sword.

Afterward, Mike blows up the Ancients' spaceship, and the Keeper of the Scrolls congratulates him. He wakes up in his psychiatrist's office and finds Jack next to the deceased doctor's body. Mike comes to the realization that Jack is his Dark World counterpart and gets stabbed by him, dying. Sheriff Butler and his deputy enter the scene and, apparently oblivious to Jack's presence, arrive at the conclusion of Mike having committed suicide and indeed being responsible for all the murders that occurred through course of the game. Jack is then seen exiting via the Dark World, leaving it ambiguous as to whether the events of the game really happened or were part of Mike's delusions.

Development
David Mullich was the producer and oversaw development of the game, while Raymond Benson wrote its script, dialog, and puzzles. His writing drew influence from David Lynch's Twin Peaks. H. R. Giger did not produce any original artwork for Dark Seed II; artwork that he had previously created was licensed for use in the game. While the character of Mike Dawson was played in the first Dark Seed by actual game developer Mike Dawson, the character in Dark Seed II is instead portrayed by actor Chris Gilbert.

Footnotes
Notes

References

External links
 
 
 Review at Adventure Classic Gaming

1995 video games
Adventure games
Cancelled Sega CD games
Classic Mac OS games
Cyberdreams games
Dissociative identity disorder in video games
Fiction about murder
Full motion video based games
H. R. Giger
Human experimentation in fiction
Point-and-click adventure games
Psychological horror games
PlayStation (console) games
Science fiction video games
Sega Saturn games
Single-player video games
Video game sequels
Video games about dreams
Video games about extraterrestrial life
Video games about the paranormal
Video games developed in the United States
Video games about parallel universes
Video games scored by Mark Morgan
Video games set in the United States
Video games with digitized sprites
Windows games